The Sisters of Mary School (SMS) sometimes abbreviated as (SOM) is a Private Catholic school in the Philippines, located in Silang, Cavite and Metro Cebu.

It consists of four campuses called Boystown and Girlstown located in different areas of Silang, Cavite and  Metro Cebu.

The founder of SMS is Msgr. Aloysius Schwartz, an American diocesan priest now known as Venerable Aloysius Schwartz.

History
The Sisters of Mary School was founded on August 15, 1985 in Sta. Mesa Manila  Philippines and later on it expanded in different areas of Cavite .

In 1990, The Sisters of Mary School established its first campus in Talisay City, which is also composed of both campuses for Boystown and Girlstown before they were separated. The Boystown campus was transferred to Minglanilla, Cebu.

Academics

The academic and curricular programs below are offered by the different school campuses of The Sisters of Mary School Philippines:

TVET courses offered in Girlstown:

 Bookkeeping NC III
Computer Systems Servicing NC II
Electronic Products Assembly and Servicing NC II
Contact Center Services NC II
Bread and Pastry Production NC II
 Dressmaking NC II
Mechatronics Servicing NC II
Technical Drafting NC II

TVET courses offered in Boystown:

 Automotive Servicing NC I and II
Bread and Pastry Production NC II
Electrical Installation and Maintenance NC II and III
Computer Systems Servicing NC II
Driving NC II
Contact Center Services NC II
Machining NC I and II
CNC Lathe and Milling Machine Operation NC II
Shielded Metal Arc Welding (SMAW) NC I and II
Technical Drafting NC II
Tailoring NC II

Campuses

Biga Campus 

Location: Bo. Biga, Silang Cavite
Maximum Capacity: 3,500 high school girls

Adlas Campus 

Location: Bo. Adlas, Silang Cavite
Maximum Capacity: 2,200 high school boys

Talisay Campus 

Location: J.P. Rizal St., Talisay City  Cebu
Maximum Capacity: 3,300 high school girls

Minglanilla Campus 

Location: Tungkop, Minglanilla, Cebu
Maximum Capacity: 2,200 high school boys

References

External links
Alumni of the Sisters of Mary School, Inc.
The Sisters of Mary Schools - Philippines

1985 establishments in the Philippines
Educational institutions established in 1985
Catholic secondary schools in the Philippines
Schools in Cebu City
Schools in Cavite
Girls' schools in the Philippines
Boys' schools in the Philippines